Paraperipatus novaebritanniae is a species of velvet worm in the Peripatopsidae family. This species is black with brown-yellow spots. Females of this species have 24 pairs of legs; males have 22 or 23 leg pairs. Females range from 14 mm to 55 mm in length, whereas males range from 14 mm to 26 mm. The type locality is in New Britain, Papua New Guinea.

References

Onychophorans of Australasia
Onychophoran species
Animals described in 1898